Paul Poirier (born November 6, 1991) is a Canadian ice dancer. With Piper Gilles, he is the 2021 World bronze medallist and 2022–23 Grand Prix Final champion, as well as a three-time Four Continents medallist (silver in 2014 and 2020, bronze in 2019), three-time Skate Canada International champion (2019, 2021–22), and two-time Canadian national champion (2020, 2022). Gilles and Poirier competed for Canada at the 2018 and 2022 Winter Olympics.

With earlier partner Vanessa Crone, he is the 2010 Grand Prix Final bronze medallist, 2011 Four Continents bronze medallist, 2008 World Junior silver medallist, and 2011 Canadian national champion.  Crone and Poirier competed for Canada at the 2010 Winter Olympics.

Personal life 
Paul Poirier was born November 6, 1991, in Ottawa, Ontario, to Debra Mendes de Franca and Marc Poirier.  In 2015, he graduated from the University of Toronto with a Bachelor of Arts in linguistics.  He continues graduate studies in linguistics part-time.  He speaks English, French, Japanese, and Spanish. His brother played in the Ontario Hockey League.

Poirier is gay and has spoken about "perhaps [being] a role model for...younger queer athletes."

Career

Early years 
Poirier began learning to skate in 1996. Early in his career, he competed in single skating, in addition to ice dancing and pair skating with Vanessa Crone. The two began skating together in May 2001.

As ice dancers, Crone/Poirier made their ISU Junior Grand Prix (JGP) debut in September 2005, placing seventh in Andorra. The following season, they took bronze at the 2006 JGP in Norway before winning the national junior title at the 2007 Canadian Championships. The duo placed ninth at the 2007 World Junior Championships.

2007–2008 season: World Junior silver
Crone/Poirier won gold at both of their JGP assignments and qualified to the JGP Final, where they finished fourth. Competing in the senior ranks, they placed fourth at the 2008 Canadian Championships. They capped off their season with silver at the 2008 World Junior Championships.

2008–2009 season
Making their senior Grand Prix debut, Crone/Poirier won silver at the 2008 Skate Canada and placed fourth at the 2008 Trophée Éric Bompard. After winning silver behind Tessa Virtue / Scott Moir at the 2009 Canadian Championships, they competed at the 2009 Four Continents Championships in Vancouver, placing fourth. They finished twelfth at the 2009 World Championships in Los Angeles, California.

2009–2010 season: Vancouver Olympics

Crone/Poirier received the bronze medal at the 2009 NHK Trophy and placed fourth at their other Grand Prix event, the 2009 Rostelecom Cup.

At the 2010 Canadian Championships, they repeated as national silver medallists and were nominated to represent Canada at the 2010 Winter Olympics.  They finished fourteenth at the Olympics and then seventh at the 2010 World Championships.

2010–2011 season: Grand Prix and Four Continents bronze, national title
Crone/Poirier began their season by capturing gold at 2010 Skate Canada International, ahead of Sinead Kerr and John Kerr, who had a fall in the free dance. At the 2010 Skate America, Poirier fell in the free dance, but their score was enough for the silver behind Meryl Davis / Charlie White, both of whom fell, and ahead of Maia Shibutani / Alex Shibutani with no falls. Their results qualified them for the 2010–11 Grand Prix Final, where they won the bronze medal.

At the 2011 Canadian Championships, with Tessa Virtue and Scott Moir absent due to Virtue's injury, Crone/Poirier narrowly won the Canadian national title over Kaitlyn Weaver / Andrew Poje.  They won a bronze medal at the 2011 Four Continents Championships in Taipei, and finished tenth at the 2011 World Championships.

On June 2, 2011, Crone and Poirier announced the end of their ten-year partnership. He said that he would search for a new partner to continue his competitive career and did not exclude looking internationally.

2011–2012 season: Debut of Gilles/Poirier

Poirier contacted American ice dancer Piper Gilles to arrange a tryout. On July 27, 2011, the two confirmed they had teamed up to represent Canada. They were unable to compete internationally in their first season due to Gilles needing a release from U.S. Figure Skating. They decided to train under Carol Lane at the Scarboro Figure Skating Club at the Ice Galaxy in Scarborough, Ontario. Their free dance was choreographed by Christopher Dean in Colorado Springs, Colorado, in early June.

Gilles/Poirier won the bronze medal at the 2012 Canadian Championships. Due to their ineligibility for international competition that season, fourth-place finishers Kharis Ralph and Asher Hill were named to Canada's delegation to the 2012 World Championships.

2012–2013 season
In September 2012, Gilles and Poirier won gold at the U.S. Classic. They received two Grand Prix assignments, 2012 Skate Canada International and 2012 Trophée Éric Bompard. They finished fourth and sixth at the two events and then won the silver medal at the 2013 Canadian Championships. They were fifth at the 2013 Four Continents, winning a small bronze medal for the free dance, and eighteenth at their first World Championships, held in London, Ontario.

2013–2014 season: Four Continents silver
In May 2013, Poirier sustained a serious ankle injury, delaying the duo's preparation for the upcoming season. Their assigned events for the 2013-14 Grand Prix season were the NHK Trophy, where they finished fifth, and the Rostelecom Cup, where they placed sixth. Gilles became a Canadian citizen in December 2013, making Gilles and Poirier eligible to participate in the Olympics.

Hampered by Poirier's injury, the duo finished fourth at the 2014 Canadian Championships and were not selected for the Canadian Olympic team. Years later, Gilles would admit that the result "was definitely disappointing, but it really made us who we are right now. We didn't want that big upset to change our goals in the future, and I think that made us stronger, more comfortable with each other because we really had to lean on each other. So I think it made all of us closer and better as athletes and more well-rounded."

Instead of the Olympics, they were sent to the 2014 Four Continents Championship, where they won the silver medal, placing behind Gilles' former partner Zachary Donohue and his new partner Madison Hubbell. Poirier opined that "we're going to take this competition with us because it taught us a lot about resilience and about being able to come back so quickly after nationals."

2014–2015 season
Gilles/Poirier won silver at both of their Grand Prix events, the 2014 Skate Canada International and 2014 Trophée Éric Bompard. These results qualified them for the 2014–15 Grand Prix of Figure Skating Final, where they placed fifth. At the 2015 Canadian Championships, they won the silver medal behind Kaitlyn Weaver / Andrew Poje. The two capped off their season with a sixth-place finish at the 2015 World Championships.

2015–2016 season
Gilles/Poirier opened their season with a win at the 2015 Ondrej Nepela Trophy. They finished as second alternates for the Grand Prix Final after taking bronze at the 2015 Skate America and silver at the 2015 Trophée Éric Bompard. After repeating as national silver medallists at the 2016 Canadian Championships.

They finished fifth at the 2016 Four Continents Championships, a result they considered disappointing, and which prompted significant revisions to their short dance program, which had initially been developed as a mix of music by The Beatles and Wolfgang Amadeus Mozart.  The revisions made the dance primarily set to Beatles music.  At the 2016 World Championships in Boston, Gilles/Poirier debuted the new program iteration, finishing fifth in the short and making the final flight in the free dance for the first time in their partnership.  Poirier called this "something new for us and something that we’ve wanted, and it’s one of the things we really hoped we’d be able to do this year."  They finished eighth in the free dance, dropping to eighth overall.

The ISU subsequently adopted elements of the short dance choreography debuted in Boston as a new pattern dance called the March, credited to Poirier, Gilles, their coach Carol Lane, and choreographer Juris Razgulajevs.

2016–2017 season
The 2016–17 season featured the return to competition of Tessa Virtue / Scott Moir, which affected the standings of the other Canadian ice dance teams. Gilles/Poirier took bronze at the 2016 Skate Canada International, the 2016 Trophée de France, and the 2017 Canadian Championships. The two struggled with mistakes in their disco-themed short dance for much of the season, with a stumble at the French event and Gilles falling at the 2017 Four Continents Championships. Gilles described the results as "physically hard and definitely tough mentally."  They finished eighth at the 2017 World Championships in Helsinki.

2017–2018 season: Pyeongchang Olympics
Gilles/Poirier placed fourth at both of their Grand Prix assignments, the 2017 Skate America and 2017 Rostelecom Cup. Following this, the two opted to change their free dance program mid-season, discarding an initial film noir-themed routine for a James Bond program.  Poirier explained that they felt the need for "a more accessible vehicle going into the Olympics and one that (fans) can more readily identify with." Their scores dramatically improved with the new program, and they earned the silver medal at the 2018 Canadian championships on the way to qualifying for the 2018 Winter Olympics in Pyeongchang, South Korea. Gilles described this as "a breath of fresh air because we've worked our entire lives for that Olympic moment; qualifying for the games has always been my dream." The duo placed eighth at their first Olympics and ended the season with a sixth-place finish at the 2018 World Championships.

2018–2019 season: Four Continents bronze
For their free dance, Gilles/Poirier envisioned a tribute to the artist Vincent van Gogh and arranged for the British busker act Govardo to create a cover version of the Don McLean song "Vincent" that had the tempo changes necessary for an ice dance program.  "Vincent" would become the team's most acclaimed program to date. Gilles would later reflect on the season and say: "We find that this program brings a different energy every time we compete it. That’s why so many people can connect with it. It can touch people in so many different emotional ways. Every time we perform it, we’re drawing a new feeling from it."

Following Kaitlyn Weaver / Andrew Poje's decision not to skate the 2018–19 Grand Prix series, Gilles/Poirier became the top-ranked Canadian team competing there. They won their first outing of the season, the Nebelhorn Trophy, having placed first in both segments. The band Govardo attended the event, meeting them for the first time.  At their first Grand Prix event, the 2018 Skate Canada International, Gilles fell during the rhythm dance, leaving them in sixth place. The two set a new personal best in the free dance, rebounding to capture the bronze medal. They won a second bronze medal at the 2018 Internationaux de France, ending as second alternates for the Grand Prix Final. Following this, it was announced that they had been added belatedly to the ice dance competition at the Golden Spin of Zagreb. They won the event, which they described as a means of regaining "positive energy" after missing the Grand Prix Final.

At the 2019 Canadian Championships, Gilles/Poirier placed second in the rhythm dance, behind Weaver/Poje, due to lower scores on the Tango Romantica pattern.  They won the free dance but finished second overall by 1.47 points.

At the 2019 Four Continents Championships, Gilles/Poirier placed fourth in the rhythm dance, behind Hubbell/Donohue, Madison Chock / Evan Bates, and Weaver/Poje.  They achieved their best results to date on the Tango Romantica pattern.  In the free dance, they placed second, passing Weaver/Poje in the free for the second event in a row, while Hubbell/Donohue had a major stationary lift error that dropped them to fourth in the free dance and fourth overall.  Gilles/Poirier won the bronze medal overall, their first Four Continents podium since 2014.  They finished the season at the 2019 World Championships, where they placed seventh.

2019–2020 season: National gold and Four Continents silver 
In designing their rhythm dance for the Broadway musical theme, the team settled on Mack and Mabel, famously used decades earlier by Torvill and Dean, though they sought to avoid closely paralleling the music used in their version.  For the free dance, they sought a Canadian artist, as the 2020 World Championships were scheduled to be held in Montreal.  Ultimately, they settled on Joni Mitchell's "Both Sides Now", familiar to both of them for its use in the film Love Actually.

Gilles/Poirier began the season at the 2019 Autumn Classic, winning by over eighteen points over silver medallists Lilah Fear / Lewis Gibson.  For their first Grand Prix assignment, they competed at the 2019 Skate Canada International in Kelowna.  They placed second in the rhythm dance, 0.63 points behind defending champions Hubbell/Donohue.  They won the free dance and took the gold medal overall by 2.70 points over Hubbell/Donohue, Gilles/Poirier's first Grand Prix gold medal, with Gilles saying they had "worked really hard for this moment."  For their second event, the 2019 Rostelecom Cup, they placed second in the free dance behind reigning World silver medallists Sinitsina/Katsalapov.  Second in the free dance as well, they won the silver medal and qualified to the Grand Prix Final for the first time in five years.  Poirier remarked that they had "had a lot of ups and downs" in the years since and, at times, had doubted whether it would happen again.

At the Grand Prix Final in Torino, Gilles/Poirier placed sixth in the rhythm dance, which was called "a bit disappointing" in comparison to their earlier Grand Prix results.  Fourth in the free dance, they rose to fifth overall, equalling their placement in 2014.

Gilles/Poirier were the heavy favourites going into the 2020 Canadian Championships.  At the beginning of the rhythm dance, Gilles' hair became caught on Poirier's jacket, though his only affected their choreography rather than one of the technical elements. They nevertheless completed the program and led second-place finishers Lajoie/Lagha by 11.60 points going in the free dance.  Winning the free dance as well by a wide margin, they claimed their first Canadian national title, which Gilles called "absolutely thrilling."

Competing at the 2020 Four Continents Championships in Seoul, Gilles/Poirier placed third in the rhythm dance, levels on the Finnstep pattern dance being the main difference between them and American rivals Chock/Bates and Hubbell/Donohue.  Second in the free dance, they rose to the silver medal overall, with Gilles remarking "I think we are very happy with ourselves."  They were assigned to compete at the World Championships, but these were cancelled as a result of the coronavirus pandemic.

2020–2021 season: World bronze 
Gilles/Poirier were assigned to the 2020 Skate Canada International, but the event was also cancelled due to the pandemic. With the pandemic continuing to make in-person competitions difficult, Gilles/Poirier competed at a virtually-held 2021 Skate Canada Challenge, winning the gold medal by a margin of 16.42 points over silver medallists Fournier Beaudry/Sørensen. The 2021 Canadian Championships were subsequently cancelled.

On February 25, Gilles and Poirier were announced as part of the Canadian team to the 2021 World Championships, to be held in Stockholm without an audience due to the pandemic. Four-time and defending World champions Papadakis/Cizeron had declined to attend the event due to the pandemic and their own past COVID illness, resulting in the podium being considered more open than in previous seasons, with Gilles/Poirier among the six teams viewed as contenders. They placed fourth in the rhythm dance, 1.78 points behind Chock/Bates in third. They came second in the free dance with a new personal test in both that segment and in total score, rising to third overall and finishing only 0.36 points behind the silver medals, Madison Hubbell and Gilles' former partner Zachary Donohue. Poirier remarked afterwards that it had "been a very long time for us; we were kind of stuck between sixth and eighth for a very long time, essentially since 2014, so I think just the pent-up frustration of so many years, being able to accomplish this just feels like such a nice relief." Their placement combined with Fournier Beaudry/Sørensen's eighth-place qualified three berths for Canadian dance teams at the 2022 Winter Olympics.

2021–2022 season: Beijing Olympics 
In the aftermath of their World medal win, Gilles and Poirier could not tour with ice shows due to ongoing pandemic restrictions and so focused on their preparations for the Olympic season. They selected an Elton John medley for the rhythm dance.  For the free dance, they collaborated with the band Govardo for the second time, having them craft a new cover version of the Beatles' song "The Long and Winding Road", which they described as "really about the road that brought us to this Olympic moment and our story." Making their season's debut at the 2021 CS Autumn Classic International, they won the event for the second time in the first major skating competition held in Canada in a year and a half.

Gilles/Poirier started on the Grand Prix at the 2021 Skate Canada International, where they improved their personal best in the rhythm dance by over two points for an 85.65 score. Winning the free dance, they also claimed their second consecutive gold medal at the event. At their second event, the 2021 Internationaux de France, they placed second in both segments to take the silver medal, albeit with lower scores than at their preceding two events of the season. Assessing the results, Gilles said that she felt they had "made some improvements compared to Skate Canada, but our score is a bit lower, and we need to go back and evaluate that." Their results qualified them to the Grand Prix Final, but it was subsequently cancelled due to restrictions prompted by the Omicron variant.

At the 2022 Canadian Championships, held in Ottawa without an audience due to the pandemic, Gilles/Poirier easily won both segments of the competition to take their second national title. They described nervousness at debuting new choreographic changes since the Grand Prix. The following day, they were named to their second Canadian Olympic team.

Gilles/Poirier began the 2022 Winter Olympics as the Canadian entries in the rhythm dance segment of the Olympic team event. Both lost a level on their twizzles and, as a result, unexpectedly finished fourth behind Italians Guignard/Fabbri, taking seven points for the Canadian team. Theirs was the highest placement for Canada on the first day of competition, which was notably missing Canadian men's champion Keegan Messing due to COVID-19 rules. They also skated the free dance segment, finishing third, while Team Canada came fourth overall. Days later in the dance event, Gilles/Poirier placed sixth in the rhythm dance, with their 83.52 score below their season's best due to Gilles' twizzle bobble. In the free dance, Gilles was unable to get into proper position in the first part of their combination lift, resulting in them placing seventh in that segment and dropping to seventh overall. She said after that it "wasn’t the skate that we wanted. And you know, it's definitely hard."

Interviewed afterward by the University of Toronto's The Varsity, Poirier reflected on the Olympics, saying that he and Gilles were undecided about attempting to compete at the 2026 Winter Olympics. He ventured that he had come to terms with the possibility of never winning an Olympic medal, saying, "it's really nice to have medals, but they don't transform who you are as a person the way that living does. In the end, you have to make peace with what happens."

Gilles and Poirier concluded the season at the 2022 World Championships, held with Russian dance teams absent due to the International Skating Union banning all Russian athletes due to their country's invasion of Ukraine. Gilles/Poirier were fifth in both segments of the competition, finishing fifth overall. Poirier said that "I don't think the results in the second half of the season were exactly how we wanted them to be, but I think, especially after the free dance skate at the Olympics, we were so proud of our performance today, and we had a blast." They performed their trademark "Vincent" program in the exhibition gala, accompanied by a live performance by the band Govardo.

2022–2023 season: Grand Prix Final champions 
Gilles and Poirier took a lengthy break from training following the Olympic season and contemplated retirement. By mid-July, they had decided to continue, but as a result of the late start, they did not participate in the Challenger events before the start of the Grand Prix. For their free program, they opted to use Andrew Lloyd Webber's Evita, music that they had periodically discussed using at points over the preceding decade. Poirier said they related to the story of "Eva trying to find her way and figure out what she's going to do and who she's going to be and what she's going to stand for."

Seeking a third consecutive victory at Skate Canada International to open the season, Gilles/Poirier set a new personal best (87.23) in the rhythm dance and nearly equaling their best in the free dance. They won the gold medal by 6.52 points over Britons Fear/Gibson. At their second assignment, the 2022 Grand Prix of Espoo, they won the rhythm dance with another new personal best in that segment (87.80), almost seven points ahead of second-place Hawayek/Baker of the USA. They set a personal best in the free dance as well (131.69) and won their second Grand Prix gold medal with a 17.03-point margin over the silver medalists, and qualified to the Grand Prix Final in first position. In anticipation of the event, Poirier said, "the next two weeks will really be about managing our energy."

As the top seed, Gilles/Poirier entered the Final in Turin as the presumptive favourites, albeit not firmly so, against struggling American pre-season favourites Chock/Bates and Italian champions Guignard/Fabbri competing on home ice. They finished first in the rhythm dance, 0.44 points ahead of a resurgent Chock/Bates. They received lower levels on some elements than in previous events, which Poirier called "a fair assessment" that he attributed to hesitance in the face of strong competition. They won the free dance as well, taking the gold medal, the most significant victory of their careers thus far, and the first Grand Prix Final victory for any Canadian competitor since Virtue/Moir in 2016. Gilles assessed that they "felt great today, from start to finish." Their training mates, Nadiia Bashynska and Peter Beaumont, won gold in the Junior Grand Prix Final on the same day.

Gilles underwent an appendectomy following the Grand Prix Final, as a result of which the team withdrew from the 2023 Canadian Championships. They were provisionally assigned to the 2023 Four Continents Championships, but subsequently withdrew to focus on recovery.

Programs

Ice dancing with Gilles

Ice dancing with Crone

Single skating

Competitive highlights 
GP: Grand Prix; CS: Challenger Series; JGP: Junior Grand Prix

Ice dancing with Gilles

Ice dancing with Crone

Single skating

Detailed results
(with Gilles)

Small medals for short and free programs awarded only at ISU Championships. At team events, medals awarded for team results only.  Current ISU personal bests highlighted in bold.

  - Event cancelled due to the terrorist attacks in Paris.

References

External links 

 
 
 

1991 births
Living people
Canadian male ice dancers
Canadian male single skaters
World Figure Skating Championships medalists
Four Continents Figure Skating Championships medalists
World Junior Figure Skating Championships medalists
Figure skaters at the 2010 Winter Olympics
Figure skaters at the 2018 Winter Olympics
Figure skaters at the 2022 Winter Olympics
Olympic figure skaters of Canada
Skating people from Ontario
Sportspeople from Ottawa
Canadian LGBT sportspeople
LGBT figure skaters
Gay sportsmen
21st-century Canadian people
21st-century Canadian LGBT people
Canadian gay men